Antirrhinum vexillo-calyculatum (syn. Sairocarpus vexillocalyculatus (Kellogg) D.A. Sutton) is a species of New World snapdragon found only in California and occasionally Oregon. This wildflower is known by several common names, including wiry snapdragon, sailflower snapdragon, and Brewer's snapdragon.

The plant twines along other plants or objects with its branchlets. It produces lavender snapdragon flowers 1 to 2 centimeters wide. The flower has a prominent lower lip and it may be streaked with darker purple. This species is most abundant in the low-elevation mountains of northern and central California, where it grows in rocky areas and especially in serpentine soil.

References

External links
USDA Plants Profile
Jepson Manual Treatment

vexillo-calyculatum
Flora of California
Flora of Oregon
Flora without expected TNC conservation status